Poliakovce is a village and municipality in Bardejov District in the Prešov Region of north-east Slovakia.

History
In historical records the village was first mentioned in 1414.

Geography
The municipality lies at an altitude of 225 metres and covers an area of 7.532 km2. It has a population of about 370 people.

References

External links
 
http://www.statistics.sk/mosmis/eng/run.html

Villages and municipalities in Bardejov District
Šariš